Wells Municipal Airport  (Harriet Field) is two miles northeast of Wells, in Elko County, Nevada. The National Plan of Integrated Airport Systems for 2011–2015 categorized it as a general aviation facility.

Facilities 
The airport covers 708 acres (287 ha) at an elevation of 5,769 feet (1,758 m). It has two runways: 8/26 is 5,508 by 75 feet (1,679 x 23 m) asphalt and 1/19 is 2,681 by 140 feet (817 x 43 m) gravel/dirt.

In the year ending September 30, 2011 the airport had 5,502 aircraft operations, average 15 per day: 99.9% general aviation and <1% military. Ten aircraft were then based here: eight single-engine and two ultralight.

See also 
 List of airports in Nevada

References

External links 
  from Nevada DOT
 Aerial image as of June 1994 from USGS The National Map
 

Airports in Nevada
Transportation in Elko County, Nevada
Buildings and structures in Elko County, Nevada